In Old Alsace (French:L'ami Fritz) is a 1920 French silent film directed by René Hervil and starring Léon Mathot, Huguette Duflos and Thérèse Kolb.

Cast
 Léon Mathot as Fritz Kobus 
 Huguette Duflos as Suzel  
 Thérèse Kolb as Catherine  
 Édouard de Max as David Sichel 
 Louis Kerly 
 Henri Maillard 
 Flamion 
 Marey 
 Maurice de Féraudy

References

Bibliography
 Dayna Oscherwitz & MaryEllen Higgins. The A to Z of French Cinema. Scarecrow Press, 2009.

External links

1920 films
Films directed by René Hervil
French silent feature films
French black-and-white films
1920s French films